Tipperary Mid, North and South was a parliamentary constituency represented in Dáil Éireann, the lower house of the Irish parliament or Oireachtas, from 1921 to 1923. The constituency elected 4 deputies (Teachtaí Dála, commonly known as TDs) to the Dáil, on the system of proportional representation by means of the single transferable vote (PR-STV).

History and boundaries 
The constituency was created in 1921 as a 4-seat constituency, under the Government of Ireland Act 1920, for the 1921 general election to the House of Commons of Southern Ireland, whose members formed the 2nd Dáil.

It succeeded the constituencies of Tipperary Mid, Tipperary North and Tipperary South which were used to elect the Members of the 1st Dáil and earlier UK House of Commons members.

It was abolished under the Electoral Act 1923, when it was replaced by the new Tipperary constituency which was first used at the 1923 general election for the Members of the 4th Dáil.

It covered most of County Tipperary except the eastern parts.

TDs

Elections

1922 general election 
P. J. Moloney was elected on the second count but figures are not available.

1921 general election 
At the 1921 general election, only four candidates were nominated in Tipperary Mid, North and South. Since this was the same as the number of seats, no ballot was needed, and all candidates were returned unopposed.

|}

See also 
Dáil constituencies
Politics of the Republic of Ireland
Historic Dáil constituencies
Elections in the Republic of Ireland

References

External links 
Oireachtas Members Database

Dáil constituencies in the Republic of Ireland (historic)
Historic constituencies in County Tipperary
1921 establishments in Ireland
1923 disestablishments in Ireland
Constituencies established in 1921
Constituencies disestablished in 1923